The Arctic and Antarctic Research Institute, or AARI (abbreviated as ААНИИ) is the oldest and largest Russian research institute in the field of comprehensive studies of Arctic and Antarctica. It is located in Saint Petersburg.

The AARI has numerous departments, such as those of oceanography, glaciology, meteorology, hydrology or Arctic river mouths and water resources, geophysics, polar geography, and others. It also has its own computer center, ice research laboratory, experimental workshops, and a museum (the Arctic and Antarctic Museum).

Scientists, such as Alexander Karpinsky, Alexander Fersman, Yuly Shokalsky, Nikolai Knipovich, Lev Berg, Otto Schmidt, Rudolf Samoylovich, Vladimir Vize, Nikolai Zubov, Pyotr Shirshov, Nikolai Urvantsev, and Yakov Gakkel have all made their valuable contributions to the work of the AARI.

Throughout its history, the AARI has organized more than a thousand Arctic expeditions, including dozens of high-latitude aerial expeditions, which transported 34(?) manned drifting ice stations Severniy Polyus ("Северный полюс", or North Pole) to Central Arctic.

History
The AARI was founded on 3 March 1920 as the Northern Research and Trade Expedition (Северная научно-промысловая экспедиция) under the Scientific and Technical Department of the All-Union Council of State Economy. In 1925, the expedition was reorganized into the Institute of Northern Studies (Институт по изучению Севера) and five years later - into the All-Union Arctic Institute (Всесоюзный арктический институт). In 1932, the institute was integrated into the Chief Directorate of the Northern Sea Route (Главное управление Северного морского пути). In 1948 the Arctic Geology Research Institute (Научно-исследовательский институт геологии Арктики, or НИИГА) was established on the basis of the geology department of the All-Union Arctic Institute, which would subordinate to the Ministry of Geology of the USSR.

In 1955, the AARI participated in the organization of Antarctic research. In 1958, it began to organize and lead all of the Soviet Antarctic expeditions, which would later make many geographic discoveries, and in the same year the All-Union Arctic Institute was renamed Arctic and Antarctic Research Institute. In 1963, the AARI was incorporated into the Chief Administration of the Hydrometeorological Service (Главное управление Гидрометеослужбы) under the Council of Ministers of the USSR (now Federal Service for Hydrometeorology and Environmental Monitoring of Russia).

In 1967, AARI was awarded the Order of Lenin. In 1968, the institute engaged in research of the areas of the Atlantic Ocean contiguous to the Arctic and Antarctica.

See also

 Arctic and Antarctic Museum
 Arkticheskiy Institut Islands
 Chief Directorate of the Northern Sea Route
 International Ice Charting Working Group
 Russian Hydrographic Service

References

External links
Official website
 Nikolai Zubov Writings at Dartmouth College Library

1920 establishments in Russia
Research institutes in Saint Petersburg
Earth science research institutes
Exploration of Antarctica
Polar exploration by Russia and the Soviet Union
Research institutes in the Soviet Union
Arctic research
Russia and the Antarctic
Soviet Union and the Antarctic
 Antarctica research agencies
Antarctic research